Manuelita Brown is an American sculptor from San Diego, California.

Biography

Early life and education
Brown has beginning in 1961, through the 1990s; Fine Art - Sculpture with Bruno Lucchesi, Scottsdale Artists, Nigel Konstam, Verrocchio Art Centre, Casole d'Elsa, Tuscany, Italy, study and internship at Fire Arts Foundry,  Layne Campbell, also earned a B.S. in Mathematics from Oregon State University in 1962, a teaching credential in secondary-level mathematics in 1966, and a M.S. in Psychology from the University of California, San Diego in 1976.

Career
Sculpting in her own studio, she has created many portraits of noted African Americans, and countless multi-cultural style sculptures in abstract, figurative realism and designs for monumental bronzes that she personally works through clay on armatures to the lost wax process.  She retired from teaching in 2000 to pursue sculpting full-time, as noted in many publications as referenced.  In 2018, Brown's work was on display at the "Legacy in Black" at the San Diego History Center in Balboa Park.  Brown's name has been suggested as a possible artist for statue of Shirley Chisholm, first Black woman elected to Congress.

Notable works
1993: Thurgood Marshall bust, Thurgood Marshall College, University of California, San Diego
1995: Matthew Henson bust, James E. Lewis Museum of Art, Baltimore, MD
1997: Almas del Mar, Westfield UTC
2006: Dr. Howard H. Carey bust, Neighborhood House, San Diego, CA
2008: Encinitas Child, Encinitas, CA
2008: Triton, University of California, San Diego
2015: Sojourner Truth statue, Thurgood Marshall College, University of California, San Diego

Awards
2000: Finalist, Sojourner Truth Memorial statue competition, Florence, Massachusetts
2002: Woman of Distinction, Soroptimist 
2015: Villager Award - Afram Global Organization Inc , #villageprojects.net

References

External links

Living people
African-American women artists
Sculptors from California
Oregon State University alumni
University of California, San Diego alumni
Year of birth missing (living people)
Place of birth missing (living people)
American women artists
African-American sculptors
21st-century African-American people
21st-century African-American women